Leine is a river of Thuringia and Lower Saxony, Germany, a tributary to the Aller.

Leine may also refer to:
Leine (Eine), a river of Saxony-Anhalt, Germany, tributary of the Eine
Leine (Helme), a river of Saxony-Anhalt, Germany, tributary of the Helme
Leine, the former German name of the village of Linie, in western Poland

People with that name

Kim Leine (born 1961), Danish-Norwegian author
Leine Loman (born 1967), former Dutch international cricketer

See also
Leine Uplands, a region in Germany which forms a part of the Lower Saxon Hills and lies along the Leine
Leine Formation, a geologic formation of the Permian, in Germany
Leine Palace, the former residence of the Hanoverian kings and current seat of the Landtag of Lower Saxony, in Hanover, Germany